An application for employment is a standard business document that is prepared with questions deemed relevant by employers. It is used to determine the best candidate to fill a specific role within the company. Most companies provide such forms to anyone upon request, at which point it becomes the responsibility of the applicant to complete the form and return it to the employer for consideration. The completed and returned document notifies the company of the applicant's availability and desire to be employed as well as their qualifications and background so that a determination can be made as to the candidate's suitability to the position.

Definition
From the employer's perspective, the application serves a number of purposes. These vary depending on the nature of the job and the preferences of the person responsible for hiring, as "each organization should have an application form that reflects its own environment". At a minimum, an application usually requires the applicant to provide information sufficient to demonstrate that he or she is legally permitted to be employed. The typical application also requires the applicant to provide information regarding relevant skills, education, and experience (previous employment or volunteer work). The application itself is a minor test of the applicant's literacy, penmanship, and communication skills. A careless job applicant might disqualify themselves with a poorly filled-out application.

The application may also require the applicant to disclose any criminal record and to provide information sufficient to enable the employer to conduct an appropriate background check. For a business that employs workers on a part-time basis, the application may inquire as to the applicant's availability at specific times and/or days and preferences in this regard. Employers may be prohibited from asking applicants about characteristics that are not relevant to the job, such as their political view or sexual orientation.

For white collar jobs, particularly those requiring communication skills, the employer will typically require applicants to accompany the form with a cover letter and a résumé. However, even employers who accept a cover letter and résumé will frequently also require the applicant to complete an application form, as the other documents may neglect to mention specific details of importance to the employer. In some instances, an application is effectively used to dissuade "walk-in" applicants, serving as a barrier between the applicant and a job interview with the person who has the authority to hire.

For many businesses, applications for employment can be filled out online, rather than submitted in person. However, it is still recommended that applicants bring a printed copy of their application to an interview.

Application forms are the second most common hiring instrument next to personal interviews. Companies will occasionally use two types of application forms, short and long. They help companies with initial screening . The answers that applicants choose to submit are helpful to the company because they can potentially become an interview question for that applicant.

Standardization and regulation
The employment application is not a standardized form, so every company may create its own as long as regulations set by the government are adhered to.

Document elements
At a minimum, applications usually ask the applicant for their name, phone number, and address. In addition, applications may also ask for previous employment information, educational background, emergency contacts, and references, as well as any special skills the applicant might have.

The three categories of information that application fields are very useful for discovering are physical characteristics, experience, and environmental factors.

Physical characteristics
If the company has a bona fide occupational qualification (BFOQ) to ask regarding a physical condition, they may ask questions about it. For example:
 The job requires a lot of physical labor. Do you have any physical problems that may interfere with this job?

Experience
Experience requirements can be separated into two groups on an application: work experience and educational background. Educational background is important because it allows a potential employer to evaluate an applicants' performance in school as well as make determinations as to personality and intelligence. Work experience is important because it will inform a potential employer if the applicant meets their specific needs. Companies are usually interested when applicants were unemployed, when/why the applicant left their previous job and their highest position at their previous job.

Socio-environmental qualifications
Companies may be interested in the applicant's social environment because it can inform them of their personality, interests, and qualities. For example, if they are extremely active within an organization, that may demonstrate their ability to communicate well with others. Being in management may demonstrate their leadership ability as well as their determination.

Photograph
Customs vary from country to country when it comes to the inclusion or non-inclusion of a photograph of the applicant. In many English-speaking countries, notably the United States, this is not customary, and books or websites giving recommendations about how to design an application typically advise against it unless explicitly requested by the employer. In other countries (for instance, Germany), the inclusion of a photograph of the applicant is still common, and many employers would consider an application incomplete without it.

In other non-English speaking European countries

France
In France, the  requires companies with more than 50 employees to request an anonymous application.

Germany
The job application is called Bewerbung in Germany and usually consists of three parts: the Anschreiben (cover letter), the Lebenslauf (curriculum vitae (CV)) and the Zeugnisse (references). The Anschreiben is used to convince the employer to submit an invitation for a job interview. It must be in paper size DIN A4, not exceed one page, a handwritten signature, and accompanied by a Lebenslauf and Zeugnisse. The Lebenslauf is documented in reverse chronological order and should give information on work experience, education and professional training as well as an applicant's skills. In Germany, the Lebenslauf usually includes a photograph called Bewerbungsfoto. Some employers, mainly governmental organisations, deliberately neglect the photograph to ensure a higher degree of objectivity in the course of assessment procedures. The Lebenslauf should be two pages long. In general, there are two options of submitting a job application in Germany: a job application folder (Bewerbungsmappe) or online (Onlinebewerbung). According to a study, the Onlinebewerbung was more favored in Germany than the Bewerbungsmappe by 2012.

Italy
The CV is the most important part of the application and should not be longer than two to three pages. It is divided into three areas:

in chronological order:
 Personal details (Informazioni personal)
 School and education (Studi e Formazione)

in reverse chronological order:
 Additional capabilities/skills (Altre conoscenze)
 Experience (Esperienze professional). As a graduate, this section is omitted. Brief information on the application motivations may be mentioned here.

The cover letter (La Lettera di accompagnamento al curriculum) is relatively short, polite and formal in Italian applications. Long versions and extensively explained motivations, as well as photos and copies of certificates, are presented only at the interview.

Spain
In Spain, the application consists of two parts: the cover letter (Carta de Candidatura) and the CV. No work or training certificates are attached. The cover letter should be short and contain the reason for applying. The CV should be structured in a tabular form. In Spain, multiple job interviews with the same company are common.

Usage by hackers
Job applications are known to be used by hackers to get employees to open attachments or links or connect USB sticks with malware. As companies typically have more financial resources than private individuals, they are often a target of cyberextortion. Ransomware such as "Petya" and "GoldenEye" were discovered to exploit job applications. Cyberespionage and attacks on critical infrastructure-related companies may be other reasons for such attacks and other than ransomware attacks may leave employees in the dark about their computer or network infection.  The best method for mitigating such risks would be to have the HR department use a separate computer for job applications that is entirely disconnected from the internal network, on which no confidential or valuable information is stored and to which no portable devices such as USB sticks that may get connected to other computers of the company are connected.

See also
Employment contract
Human resource management
Recruitment
Staffing models

References

Recruitment
Business documents
Employment
Human resource management

fr:Demande d'emploi